"Germania", WoO 94, is a patriotic song by Ludwig van Beethoven written in order to celebrate the victory against Napoleon.

History 

During and after the defeat of Napoleon during the Wars of Liberation, German patriotism flourished and spurred the production of poems, plays, and songs exalting the nation. Among these German artists who contributed to the glorification of their country was Friedrich Treitschke. In 1814, he wrote a patriotic opera, Die gute Nachricht, to which several Viennese composers contributed music. Beethoven composed the music for the closing song, in B-flat major, celebrating Germania, the allegory of Germany. The work was first performed on 11 April 1814 in the Theater am Kärntnertor in Vienna. It is written for a baritone solo (the role of Bruno), SATB chorus, 2 flutes, 2 oboes, 2 clarinets, 2 bassoons, 2 French horns, 2 trumpets, timpani, and a string section.

Beethoven's own patriotic motivation is illustrated in the following letter he wrote about his participation in a charity concert for the soldiers of the preceding war:
{| style="width: 95%;"
|It was a rare assembly of outstanding artists, in which each one, inspired by the sole thought of contributing by his art something for the benefit of the Fatherland, worked together without thought of rank and in subordinate positions to bring about an outstanding performance. ... The leadership of the whole assemblage fell to me only because the music was of my composition. Had it been by someone else, I should have been as willing as Hr. Hummel to take my place at the great drum, since we were all filled solely with the purest feeling of love for the Fatherland and with the joy of giving of our powers for those who had given so greatly for us.
|style="padding-left: 1em;"|Es war ein seltener Verein vorzüglicher Tonkünstler, worin ein jeder einzig durch den Gedanken begeistert war, mit seiner Kunst auch etwas zum Nutzen des Vaterlandes beitragen zu können, und ohne alle Rangordnung, auch auf untergeordneten Plätzen zur vortrefflichen Ausführung des Ganzen mitwirkte ... Mir fiel nur darum die Leitung des Ganzen zu, weil die Musik von meiner Komposition war; wäre sie von einem Anderm gewesen, so würde ich mich eben so gern wie Herr Hummel an die grosse Trommel gestellt haben, da uns alle nichts als das reine Gefühl der Vaterlandsliebe und des freudigen Opfers unserer Kräfte für diejenigen, die uns so viel geopfert haben, erfüllte.
|}

Lyrics

Other patriotic works
Besides "Germania", Beethoven also set other patriotic songs to music, for example "Des Kriegers Abschied" and "Abschiedsgesang an Wiens Bürger".

References

External links

, Gerald Finley, BBC Singers, BBC Symphony Orchestra, Andrew Davis

Compositions by Ludwig van Beethoven
1814 compositions
Compositions in B-flat major
German patriotic songs